This article shows the rosters of all participating teams at the men's rugby sevens tournament at the 2016 Summer Olympics in Rio de Janeiro.

Pool A

Argentina
The following is the Argentina roster in the men's rugby sevens tournament of the 2016 Summer Olympics. On August 9, Bruzzone replaced Etchart and Rojas by injury.

Head coach: Santiago Gómez Cora

Brazil
The following is the Brazil roster in the men's rugby sevens tournament of the 2016 Summer Olympics.

Head coach: Andrés Romagnoli

Fiji
The following is the Fiji roster in the men's rugby sevens tournament of the 2016 Summer Olympics.

Head coach: Ben Ryan

United States
The following is the American roster in the men's rugby sevens tournament of the 2016 Summer Olympics.

Head coach: Mike Friday

Pool B

Australia
The following is the Australia roster in the men's rugby sevens tournament of the 2016 Summer Olympics. Tom Kingston replaced injured Lewis Holland after he injured his hamstring on Day 1.

Head coach: Andy Friend

France
The following is the France roster in the men's rugby sevens tournament of the 2016 Summer Olympics.

Head coach: Frédéric Pomarel

South Africa
The following is the South Africa roster in the men's rugby sevens tournament of the 2016 Summer Olympics.

Head coach: Neil Powell

Spain
The following is Spain's roster in the men's rugby sevens tournament of the 2016 Summer Olympics.

Head coach: José Ignacio Incháusti

Pool C

Great Britain
The following is the Great Britain roster in the men's rugby sevens tournament of the 2016 Summer Olympics.

Head coach: Simon Amor

Japan
The following is the Japan roster in the men's rugby sevens tournament of the 2016 Summer Olympics.

Head coach: Tomohiro Segawa

Kenya
The following is the Kenya roster in the men's rugby sevens tournament of the 2016 Summer Olympics - age represents each players age when the Olympics took place.

Head coach: Benjamin Ayimba

New Zealand
The following is the New Zealand roster in the men's rugby sevens tournament of the 2016 Summer Olympics.

Head coach: Gordon Tietjens

See also
Rugby sevens at the 2016 Summer Olympics – Women's team squads

References

External links
 – Rio 2016 Olympic Coverage

2016

Squads